The Bull Run Mountains are a mountain range of the Blue Ridge Mountains in northern Virginia in the United States. The Bull Run Mountains, together with Catoctin Mountain in Virginia and Maryland, make up the easternmost front of the Blue Ridge.

The mountain range is the home of the Virginia Outdoors Foundation's Preserve at Bull Run Mountains, which is a state-designated Natural Area Preserve dedicated to the scientific and educational potential of the region. The Preserve at Bull Run Mountains has over seven miles of trails that are open to the public on Fridays, Saturdays, and Sundays - year round.

The mountain range also holds several communities of residents, which includes the Bull Run Mountain Estates.

Interstate 66, the John Marshall Highway (Virginia Route 55) and the Manassas Gap Railroad pass through the range at Thoroughfare Gap.

Geography
In the north, from Aldie to the headwaters of Bull Run Creek, the range serves as the eastern border of the southern Loudoun Valley. South of Bull Run Creek, the watershed of the range forms the western border of Prince William with Fauquier and thus the eastern slopes are in the former county, while the western slopes are in the latter.

The range consists of three closely spaced ridges (with several spurs), which converge in the center of the range. The northern section of the range consists of a solitary ridge, which dies out towards the center of the range, whereupon two ridges to the west gain prominence.  In the southern section the central ridge dies out as well and the westernmost ridge solely comprises the range. The section of the Bull Run Mountains south of Thoroughfare Gap is sometimes referred to as the Pond Mountains.  The Broken Hills intersect the range south of I-66 in the southern section.

Geology
The Bull Run Mountains are a geological extension of the same formation that makes up the Catoctin Mountain.  This formation consist mainly of Catoctin greenstone interspersed with white quartz and Precambrian metamorphosed basalt flows.  The lower ridges on the eastern front also contain Jurassic basalt flows.  These rocks were transported westward to their current location and uplifted during the Alleghenian Orogeny.

History
The Battle of Thoroughfare Gap was fought on the mountain prior to the Second Battle of Manassas during the American Civil War.

Peaks and gaps
Peaks (from north to south)
Aldie Mountain []
Long Hill Mountain []
Bull Run Ridge []
High Acre Ridge []
Griffen Mountain []
Fishback Ridge []
Signal Mountain []
High Point Mountain []
Bisquit Mountain []
Pond Mountain []
Gaps (from north to south)
Buchannon Gap []
Cold Spring Gap []
Hopewell Gap []
Thoroughfare Gap []

Notes

External links

 Virginia Outdoors Foundation - Bull Run Mountains Natural Area Preserve
 Bull Run Mountains Conservancy, Inc. (BRMC)
 Prince William Conservation Alliance

Mountain ranges of Virginia
Blue Ridge Mountains
Mountains of Fauquier County, Virginia
Mountains of Loudoun County, Virginia
Mountains of Prince William County, Virginia
Northern Virginia